Kevin Stevens is an ice hockey player.

Kevin Stevens may also refer to:

Kevin Stevens (footballer), Australian rules footballer
Kevin Stevens (rugby league), Australian rugby league footballer
Kevin Stevens (rugby union), South African rugby union player

See also
Kevin Stephens (disambiguation)